The Grand Oaks Museum, formerly known as the Florida Carriage Museum, is located in Weirsdale, Florida in the United States. It contains equine-related artifacts and artwork, as well as over 160 antique horse-drawn carriages from Europe and America. The museum is housed at The Grand Oaks Resort, an equestrian boarding and eventing venue.  The 400 acre equestrian resort property of which the museum is part, was purchased by Tom Golisano in 2011.  Once known to be a destination for only carriage driving, the property now hosts different equestrian athletes in a variety of disciplines. The Grand Oaks Resort is a United States Equestrian Federation accredited training facility.

Footnotes

External links
The Grand Oaks Resort and Museum - home of the Florida Carriage Museum

Museums in Marion County, Florida
Carriage museums in the United States
Transportation museums in Florida